Meldrum is an unincorporated community located in Bell County, Kentucky, United States.

References

Unincorporated communities in Bell County, Kentucky
Unincorporated communities in Kentucky